Brent Anderson (born in Pascagoula, Mississippi) is an American country music singer. He has charted on Hot Country Songs with the single "Amy's Song".

Anderson learned to play bass guitar at age 7, and later began playing acoustic guitar in a trio that included his father and father's cousin. By 17, Anderson had signed his first songwriting deal. He then signed with Sea Gayle, a division of Arista Nashville owned by Brad Paisley.

In late 2011, he released his debut single "Amy's Song". The song samples Pure Prairie League's 1973 hit "Amie" and includes backing vocals from Vince Gill and Pure Prairie League founder Craig Fuller. Taste of Country reviewer Billy Dukes gave the song four stars out of five, praising Anderson's "smoky" voice and the lyrics.

He wrote the 2014 song Lonely Tonight, which was sung by Blake Shelton and hit number 1 on the Billboard Country Airplay charts.

Although Anderson released no more material through Arista, he co-produced Chris Janson's album Buy Me a Boat and the 2017 single "Fix a Drink". These songs also feature Anderson on background vocals and acoustic guitar.

Discography

Extended plays

Singles

References

External links
Official website

1988 births
Living people
People from Pascagoula, Mississippi
American country singer-songwriters
American male singer-songwriters
Arista Nashville artists
Country musicians from Mississippi
Singers from Nashville, Tennessee
Singer-songwriters from Mississippi
Country musicians from Tennessee
21st-century American male singers
21st-century American singers
Singer-songwriters from Tennessee